The  is an alternate history political thriller media mix created by the Japanese writer and filmmaker Mamoru Oshii in 1986. The most famous installment of the franchise, especially outside Japan, is the 1999 anime film Jin-Roh: The Wolf Brigade.

The saga is centered on the fictitious Tokyo police Special Armed Garrison whose emblem and nickname is Kerberos (a.k.a. Cerberus), the mythological three-headed watchdog of hell.

The franchise is currently owned by Mamoru Oshii; It consists of works based on Oshii's original story spanning various media including tokusatsu feature films, radio dramas, comic books, animation films and monographs. Licensed products are mainly Special Armed Garrison powered suit based action figures or garage kits called Protect Gears, and Kerberos Saga episodes derived soundtracks, storyboards, and guidebooks. Merchandising includes posters, folding fans, mousepads, statuette busts, tee-shirts, and even bottles of wine with a dedicated online shop available on the official website.

The most famous paraphernalia of the franchise is the Protect Gears, the powered exoskeleton suits worn by members of the Special Armed Garrison. They were designed by mechanical and character designers and RahXephon director Yutaka Izubuchi.

Release chronology

Kerberos story arc
1987 : While Waiting for the Red Spectacles (紅い眼鏡を待ちつつ), Radio drama
1987 : The Red Spectacles (紅い眼鏡), Feature-length tokusatsu film
1988 : Kerberos Panzer Cop - Part I (犬狼伝説 第一部), Comic book series (Act1~4)
1990 : Kerberos Panzer Cop: Original Edition (犬狼伝説 オリジナル版), Comic book volume (vol.1)
1991 : StrayDog: Kerberos Panzer Cops (ケルベロス 地獄の番犬), Feature-length tokusatsu film
1999 : Kerberos Panzer Cop - Part II (犬狼伝説 第二部), Comic book series  (Act5~8)
1999 : Jin-Roh: The Wolf Brigade (人狼), animated feature film
 2018 : Illang: The Wolf Brigade (인랑), Korean live-action remake
2000 : Kerberos Panzer Cop: Conclusion (犬狼伝説 完結篇), Comic book volume (vol.2)
2003 : The Killers (キラーズ), Comic book short story
2003 : Kerberos Saga Rainy Dogs (Rainy Dogs 紅い足痕), Comic book series (Act01~08)
2005 : Kerberos Saga Rainy Dogs (犬狼伝説 紅い足痕), graphic collection (with "The Killers" and the previously unreleased "Act00")
2006 : Kerberos Panzer Jäger (ケルベロス 鋼鉄の猟犬), radio drama
2006 : Kerberos & Tachiguishi (ケルベロスＸ立喰師 腹腹時計の少女), Comic book series (Act1~7)
2007 : Kerberos & Tachiguishi (ケルベロスＸ立喰師 腹腹時計の少女), Comic book volume
2009 : Kerberos Panzer Cops: Tokyo War (ケルベロス 東京市街戦 首都警特機隊全記録), Monograph (with Special Issue)
2009 : Kerberos Panzer Cop: Special Issue (前夜-ケルベロス騒乱異聞), Comic book short story
2010 : Kerberos Panzer Cop: A Revision (犬狼伝説 20周年エディション), Graphic collection collecting revised Volume 1 and 2, with Special IssueTachiguishi story arc
1984 : Urusei Yatsura: Hisatsu! Tachigui Wars!! (うる星やつら ~必殺! 立ち食いウォーズ!!~), TV anime series (episode #99)
1987 : While Waiting For The Red Spectacles (紅い眼鏡を待ちつつ), Radio drama
2004 : Tachiguishi-Retsuden (立喰師列伝), novel
2006 : Tachiguishi-Retsuden (立喰師列伝), live-action/animated hybrid feature adaptation of the novel
2006 : Onna Tachiguishi-Retsuden (女立喰師外伝　ケツネコロッケのお銀), Short film
2006 : Kerberos & Tachiguishi (ケルベロスＸ立喰師 腹腹時計の少女), Comic book series (Act1~7)
2007 : Kerberos & Tachiguishi(ケルベロスＸ立喰師 腹腹時計の少女), graphic collection
2007 : Shin-Onna Tachiguishi Retsuden (真女立喰師列伝), Short film

20th anniversary
In order to celebrate The Red Spectacles' 20-year anniversary (actually the movie's 1986 production since the theatrical release in February 1987), a new Protect Gear armour (Type 34 "Wolfpelz") was designed by Jun Suemi in 2006 as part of a new Kerberos Saga project. This new episode was Kerberos Panzer Jäger a radio drama series narrating the Protect Gear's roots in the 1940s German-Soviet War.

2006 was also the opening year for the Kerberos Saga's official website. Kerberos Saga official website owner Raiden (Nippon Cultural Broadcasting Media Bridge Inc.) released a collectible bottle of German wine, Riesling through the official online shop.

As a 20th celebration of the Kerberos Panzer Cop original edition (1990 volume compilation by Nihon Shuppan Sha), the Kerberos Saga's new publisher Gakken released a collector boxset Kerberos Panzer Cop a Revision: 20th edition (犬狼伝説 20周年エディション). This boxset features both volumes from Kerberos Panzer Cop in B5 size original aspect with "digitally refined" graphic arts by Kamui Fujiwara (original illustrator), a pamphlet and a new Revoltech Yamaguchi Protect Gear figure.

In March 2009, a new comic book chapter entitled Kerberos Panzer Cop: Special Issue, was pre-published in Gakken's Kerberos Saga monograph Kerberos Panzer Cops: Tokyo War. This was released as a sample of the two-volume Kerberos Panzer Cop "revised edition" to which it was included.

Setting
Characters and organizations

As a military science fiction work the Kerberos Saga's main characters are members of the rival military and police services, namely the Shutokei (a.k.a. the "Capital Police" in the English language adaptation), the Self-Police ("Local Police" in the English adaptation) and the JSDF. However, these conflictual forces have a common foe, Anti-government organizations and terrorists such as The Sect and its factions.

Secondary and guest appearance characters introduced by author Mamoru Oshii are taken from his previous works such as culinary art and rhetoric masters Tachiguishi ("Fast Food Grifters" in the English adaptation) or Detective Matsui from the Patlabor franchise.

Members of the saga's core organisation, the Shutokei's Special Armed Garrison, have an animal counterpart which is an allegory and sometimes a metonymy. This animal can be a mythological dog such as Cerberus (the garrison's emblem) and Laelaps as in the comic book, or it can be a German dog breeds as in Kerberos Panzer Cop and its sequel Kerberos Saga: Rainy Dogs; this comic book series original title means "Dog-Wolf Legend" (犬狼伝説, kenrou densetsu). It can be a Japanese wolf (狼, Ookami) as in Jin-Roh ("Man-Wolf" in English) and in Kerberos & Tachiguishi which borrow drama parts to the Little Red Riding Hood tale. Also, it can be a stray dog as in the 1991 eponymous movie.

Timeline
The Kerberos Saga is based upon an alternate history with key events called . Altered historical events turned into fiction include Japan siding with the Allies, the Germany-won battle of Stalingrad, Stauffenberg's then-successful assassination attempt on Hitler, the occupation of Japan by Germany - instead of the United States - called , and the prominent 26 February coup d'état (a.k.a. "Kerberos Uprising") attempted by the Special Armed Garrison instead of the Imperial Japanese Army.

Main locations
Although the saga's plot is mainly located in the Japanese capital (as the Special Armed Garrison jurisdiction is limited to the Tokyo area), some episodes happen in foreign cities including Taipei and Tainan (StrayDog: Kerberos Panzer Cops), Old Havana (The Killers) and Stalingrad (Kerberos Panzer Jäger).

Among the Tokyo landmarks appearing in the saga are Odaiba (The Red Spectacles), Shibuya, the Tokyo International Airport (Kerberos Panzer Cop Act4), Tokyo Metropolitan Police Department headquarters building (Kerberos Panzer Cop Act8), the Prime Minister's Official Residence (also known as Kantei) (Kerberos Panzer Cop Act8) and the University of Tokyo's Yasuda Auditorium (Kerberos Saga Rainy Dogs Act3).

A recurring location is sewer, it can be the Tokyo sewer as in Kerberos Panzer Cop (Act 1) and Jin-Roh: The Wolf Brigade or abroad sewer as in Kerberos Saga Rainy Dogs (Act 8). In all these works, sewer is the final stage holding the Special Armed Garrison (Kerberos) main character's last fight. In Greek mythology, the Kerberos (Cerberus) watchdog guards the gates of the Underworld, called Hades, to prevent those who have crossed the river Styx from ever escaping. Hence the sewer can be regarded as an allegory of the Underworld; the original title for the 1991 movie StrayDog is "kerberos: watchdog of jigoku" (ケルベロス 地獄の番犬, keruberosu: jigoku no banken) with jigoku being the realm of the dead in the Japanese mythology.

Releases

Japanese releases
The saga started in January 1987 with the Japanese broadcast of the radio drama series While Waiting for the Red Spectacles (紅い眼鏡を待ちつつ, Akai megane o machi tsutsu), prior to the theatrical release of the live-action film The Red Spectacles (紅い眼鏡, Akai megane). A manga series adaptation, Kerberos Panzer Cop (Kenrou densetsu) started the following year and was compiled as a single volume (Acts 1~4) in 1990.

The following year was released StrayDog: Kerberos Panzer Cops (ケルベロス 地獄の番犬, Keruberosu jigoku no banken), the first theatrical adaptation of the manga.

In 1999, the manga series was completed (Acts 5~8) and re-released as two compilation volumes. A few months later was released Jin-Roh (人狼, Jinrou) the anime adaptation of the first manga. It remains the franchise's most popular work outside Japan until today.Tachigui: The Amazing Lives of the Fast Food Grifters (立喰師外伝, Tachiguishi retsuden), an animation feature spin-off was released in theaters and DVD in 2006.

Asian releasesKerclros Panzer Cop 犬狼伝説, an unlicensed Chinese version of the 1990 manga volume was published in Taiwan in the early 1990s.犬狼傳說, a Chinese version complete volume (Acts 1~8) was available in Malaysia in 2000. A licensed, two volumes, Chinese version of the Japanese 2000 re-edition ("Frozen Version") was issued in Hong Kong the same year. A similar edition was available in the Korean language in South Korea the same year.

A traditional Chinese 2-volume licensed edition was published in Taiwan in 2002.

North American releases
A six-issues English adaptation of the first manga volume was published in 1994, in the United States and Canada as Hellhounds: Panzer Cops. A compilation volume edition was published in 1997.

The English dubbed version of Jin-Roh was released in North America in 2001.

Two years later, the English subtitled version of the 1987 and 1991 live-action films was released on DVD.

European releasesHellhounds: Panzer Cops, the English adaptation of the first manga volume, was translated into German and serialized in a German book from 1996 to 1997.

In 1998, the American Hellhounds: Panzer Cops all-in-one volume was licensed and distributed in the United Kingdom.

The following year Jin-Roh was premiered in France and later released in Germany. It was one year before the Japanese release.

Toy lines
With each new episode release, Japanese toys and model kits manufacturers such as Kaiyodo, Medicom, or Takara produce Protect-Gear scale models.

Fan works
After the North American release of Jin-Roh, various Kerberos Protect-Gear skins were created by fans to be used in the popular Counter-Strike FPS, an American video game series (1998~2004).

In 2005, Images of the Last Battalion, an independent short anime directed by a student, Koichi Kishita, was released in Japanese film contests. The following year, the bootleg video was edited and projected as an official trailer at Mamoru Oshii's Kerberos Panzer Jäger launch party and Kishita joined Production I.G's 3DCG team.

Japanese and Chinese Protect-Gear fans sculpted, modified, or repainted licensed toys. Some of these "custom" items are released as limited edition garage kits available in conventions and import action figure shops and websites.

See also
 Patlabor (created by Headgear, in which Mamoru Oshii and Yutaka Izubuchi are members)
 Starship Troopers by Robert A. Heinlein (popularizes the idea of powered exoskeleton)

References

Sources
 Axis Animation (English)
 GA Graphic official website (Japanese)
 Images of the Last Battalion@Digital Frontier Grand Prix 2005 (Japanese)
 Jin-Roh DTS Edition booklet, Bandai Visual (Japanese)
 Jin-Roh Maniaxx, Kadokawa Shoten,  (Japanese)
 JOQR Radio (Japanese)
 Kenji Kawai official English website (English)
 Kenji Kawai's official website (Japanese/English)
 Kenrou Densetsu Fukyoban, Nihon Shuppansha,  (Japanese)
 Kenrou Densetsu, Nihon Shuppansha,  (Japanese)
 Kerberos Panzer Jäger official website (Japanese)
 Kerberos Panzer Jäger@Raiden Kinema channel 2 (Japanese)
 Kerberos Panzer Jäger@Raiden Kinema channel 9 (Japanese)
 Kerberos saga at the Hobby Japan website (Japanese)
 Mamoru Oshii's official website (Japanese)
 Monthly Comic Ryu official website (Japanese)
 Production I.G official English website (English)
 Production I.G Special Site (Japanese)
 Watch Impress (Japanese'')

 
Mass media franchises
Military science fiction
Japan Self-Defense Forces in fiction
Alternate history
Dystopian fiction